The Smolny Institute of Noble Maidens of Saint Petersburg (Russian: Смольный институт благородных девиц Санкт-Петербурга) was the first women's educational institution in Russia that laid the foundation for women's education in the country. It was Europe's first public educational institution for girls.

History

Institute under Catherine the Second
It was originally called the Imperial Educational Society of Noble Maidens. It was founded on the initiative of Ivan Betskoy and in accordance with a decree signed by Catherine the Second on May 16, 1764. This society, as stated in the decree, was created in order to "give the state educated women, good mothers, useful members of the family and society". The name Smolny comes from the Smolny Palace, built in 1729 by Peter I near the village of Smolny, in which there was a tar factory.

Catherine, a fan of the progressive ideas of Montaigne, Locke and Fenelon, wanted to establish an educational institution similar to the Saint–Cyr Institute near Paris. According to the charter, children were supposed to enter an institution no older than six years of age and stay there for twelve years, and a receipt was taken from their parents that they would not demand them back under any pretext before the expiration of this period. The Empress hoped, by removing children for a long time from an ignorant environment and returning an already developed and ennobled girl there, to help soften morals and create a "new breed of people". The Senate was ordered to print and send the charter of this institution to all the provinces, provinces and cities, "so that each of the nobles could, if he so wishes, entrust his daughters with this established upbringing". The decree provided for the education of two hundred noble maidens in the newly built Novodevichy Convent.

In 1765, at the institute, which was originally established as a closed privileged educational institution for the daughters of the noble nobility, a department was opened for the bourgeois maidens (non-noble estates, except serfs). The building for the Meshchansky school was erected by the architect Yury Felten.

Further history
In 1796, the institute entered the Office of the Institutions of Empress Maria.

In 1806, a special building was built for the institute according to the project of the architect Giacomo Quarenghi.

The Smolny Institute accepted daughters of persons of ranks no lower than a colonel and a Real State Adviser to the treasury bill and daughters of hereditary nobles for an annual fee, and prepared them for court and social life.

In 1848, a two-year pedagogical class was opened at the institute for the training of teachers, and the philistine department was transformed into the St. Petersburg Alexander School (from 1891 – the Alexander Institute).

In 1859–1862, the class inspector of the institute was Konstantin Ushinsky, who carried out a number of progressive transformations in it (a new seven-year curriculum with a large number of hours devoted to Russian, geography, history, natural sciences, etc.). After Ushinsky's forced departure from the institute, all of his major transformations were eliminated.

After 1917
In October 1917, the institute, headed by Princess Vera Golitsyna, moved to Novocherkassk.

The last Russian release took place in February 1919 in Novocherkassk. Already in the summer of 1919, the institute left Russia and continued to work in Serbia where it would continue to teach the daughters of white emigres until 1932.

Study at the institute

Initially, the pupils were divided into four ages: from 6 to 9 years, from 9 to 12 years, from 12 to 15 years, from 15 to 18 years. The institution sewed special uniform dresses of a certain color for all the pupils of the institute: at a young age – coffee, in the second – dark blue, in the third – blue and at an older age – white. Brown color symbolized proximity to the earth and was practical, especially for younger children. Lighter colors symbolized increasing education and accuracy. Parents or relatives who assigned the girl to the institute should have given "a written commitment that they, prior to the expiration of the period set for education, will not demand her back under any circumstances".

During the training, special attention was paid to the Law of God and languages (domestic and foreign). The program also included teaching Russian literature, geography, arithmetic, history, music, dancing, drawing, secular manners, various types of economics. The main attention was paid to moral education.

Later, the training period was reduced to 9 years; Empress Maria Fyodorovna believed that "children, for such a long time, are weaned from their parents so that, at the end of the course, they return home with disgust" and in 1797 the youngest age was eliminated; now the pupils were divided into three ages: "blue", "gray" and "white" (senior); in the "philistine branch" began to accept from 10 years.

At the final public exam of students of Smolny, the emperor and his family were usually present. The first graduation from the Institute of Noble Maidens, as well as the philistine school, took place on May 11, 1776. At the end of the institute, the best graduates received a "code" – a gold monogram in the form of the initial of Empress Catherine II, worn on a white bow with gold stripes; in the first issue, the "cipher" received the eight best pupils: Alymova, Molchanova, Rubanovskaya, Levshina, Borshchova, Eropkina, von Valshtein and Nelidova. Subsequently, the cipher received from 6 to 10 of the best pupils.

According to the head of the scientific and exposition department of the Smolny State Museum, Olga Fedorova, the institutes were happy to break free, of which they had long dreamed; one of the institutes in her recordings on the album recalled, "how they and Zina "fried" on the piano four hands".

Some students of the institute became maids of honor of the court.

The training course of the institute was equated to the course of girls' high schools.

Notable alumni 
 Baroness Olga von Root (1901–????), singer and stage actress
 Alexandra Tegleva (1884–1955), nursemaid in the Imperial Russian household

See also
Institutes of Noble Maidens in the Russian Empire
Finishing school

References

Sources

Elena Likhacheva. Materials for the History of Female Education in Russia. Volumes 1–4 – Saint Petersburg, 1890–1901

Maria Uglichaninova. Memoirs of the Pupil of the Smolny Monastery of the Forties – Moscow, 1901
Zinaida Mordvinova. State Lady Maria Leontyeva – Saint Petersburg, 1902
Nikolai Cherepnin. The Imperial Educational Society of Noble Maidens. Volume 1–3 – Saint Petersburg–Petrograd, 1914–1915

Ozerskaya F. S. Female Education // Essays on the History of the School and Pedagogical Thought of the Peoples of the Soviet Union in the 18th and First Half of the 19th Centuries – Moscow, 1973

External links

Smolny Institute – an Article from the Great Soviet Encyclopedia
Smolny Institute in the Era of Catherine II. Excerpt from the Historical Essay of Zinaida Mordvinova. 1914

History of Saint Petersburg
1764 establishments in the Russian Empire
Girls boarding schools
Girls' schools in Russia
Schools in Saint Petersburg
Educational institutions established in 1764
Catherine the Great